Lewis S. Hills House may refer to:

Lewis S. Hills House (425 E. 100 South), Salt Lake City, Utah, listed on the NRHP in Salt Lake City, Utah
Lewis S. Hills House (126 S. 200 West), Salt Lake City, Utah, listed on the NRHP in Utah

See also
Hills House (disambiguation)